Lucas Martín Valdemarín (born 13 May 1978) is a former footballer from Argentina who played for Vélez, Unión Española (Chile), Elche (Spain), AIK (Sweden) and Club San Luis (Mexico).

Career
Valdemarín developed his career as a youth with Sportivo 9 de Julio. In 1996, he was signed by Talleres de Córdoba, but shortly after Vélez Sársfield acquired his playing rights. During his period at Vélez Valdemarín struggled to earn a spot in the first team, and the club loaned him to other teams multiple times: to Independiente Rivadavia and Racing Club in Argentina, Unión Española of Chile and Elche CF from Spain, with two more spells with Vélez in between.

In 2006, he became a free agent and signed for Arsenal de Sarandí, where he formed a striker partnership with Mauro Óbolo. The following year, both relocated to Sweden to play for AIK Fotboll. In 2008 Valdemarín reached a mutual agreement with AIK to terminate his contract, and joined Colón de Santa Fe. He was a starter at the beginning, but his due to his lack of effectivity he was relegated to the bench. During the first semester of 2009, he had a brief spell in Mexico with San Luis F.C. Back in Colón he couldn't secure a place in the squad, and transferred to Defensa y Justicia in July 2009. In June 2010 ends his career.

References

External links
 Argentine Primera statistics

Living people
1978 births
Argentine footballers
Sportspeople from Córdoba Province, Argentina
Talleres de Córdoba footballers
Club Atlético Vélez Sarsfield footballers
Independiente Rivadavia footballers
Racing Club de Avellaneda footballers
Arsenal de Sarandí footballers
Unión Española footballers
Defensa y Justicia footballers
AIK Fotboll players
Elche CF players
Club Atlético Colón footballers
San Luis F.C. players
Argentine expatriate sportspeople in Sweden
Argentine expatriate footballers
Allsvenskan players
Argentine Primera División players
Chilean Primera División players
Segunda División players
Liga MX players
Expatriate footballers in Mexico
Expatriate footballers in Spain
Expatriate footballers in Chile
Expatriate footballers in Sweden
Argentine expatriate sportspeople in Mexico
Argentine expatriate sportspeople in Spain
Association football forwards